1992 Emperor's Cup Final was the 72nd final of the Emperor's Cup competition. The final was played at National Stadium in Tokyo on January 1, 1993. Yokohama Marinos won the championship.

Overview
Defending champion Yokohama Marinos won their 6th title, by defeating Verdy Kawasaki 2–1 with Takashi Mizunuma and Takuya Jinno goal.

Match details

See also
1992 Emperor's Cup

References

Emperor's Cup
1992 in Japanese football
Yokohama F. Marinos matches
Tokyo Verdy matches